Temple is ghost town located in Williams County, North Dakota, United States. There are some remaining structures which include: a small garage, a couple small outbuildings and a couple caved-in houses. In 2003, one of the last two business buildings was either torn down or burned. The school was moved in 2010 and reportedly used as an addition to a house. The last business building collapsed in 2010, and was disposed of by 2012. One of the few remaining abandoned houses was destroyed in 2015. Also in 2015, the church was burned and razed, the reason is said to be because "it had deteriorated to the point that it became dangerous." There is now an occupied camper on the same spot the school was located.

Geography
Temple is located at 48°23'20.31"N 103°03'21.66"W. The elevation is 2,352 feet.

History
The township known as Temple was first established on July 16, 1906, and was originally named Haarstad, for Ole G. Haarstad, the township postmaster and townsite owner. The town was later renamed to "Temple" by officials of the Great Northern Railway. Temple's post office was created on March 12, 1908, and was closed April 30, 1965.

References

Ghost towns in North Dakota
Populated places in Williams County, North Dakota
Populated places established in 1906
1906 establishments in North Dakota